Eressa lutulenta is a moth of the family Erebidae. It was described by Snellen in 1879. It is found on Java and Sulawesi.

References

Eressa
Moths described in 1879